Danny Justin Thomas (born 1 May 1981) is an English former footballer who played as a left-winger.

Career
Born in Leamington Spa, Warwickshire, between 1995 and 1997 Thomas attended Lilleshall National School for gifted footballers after being offered a 2-year scholarship. During his time at Lilleshall Thomas was playing with the likes of Scott Parker and Francis Jeffers, whilst the academic year above hosted the likes of Michael Owen and Wes Brown. He started his career as a trainee at Nottingham Forest and later Leicester City, and made his first team debut against Newcastle United in December 1999. February 2002 saw him move on to AFC Bournemouth. During his time with The Cherries he was a first team regular in the side that won promotion to Division Two. However, he featured only infrequently the following season where he played a match for Notts County reserves, and eventually joined Boston United in March 2004. He scored a spectacular free kick on his debut for the Pilgrims. In the 2004–05 season he started 40 matches, scoring 6 goals.

He signed for Shrewsbury Town on non-contract terms after spells training with both Grimsby Town and Cheltenham Town. On 25 January 2007, he signed for Hereford United until the end of the season. The pacy winger made his first team debut against Barnet on the left wing, and duly capped an impressive performance by scoring in the last minute of the match. He was a regular on the left wing for the remainder of the season, and later left having turned down a contract.

On 15 June, after deciding not to re-sign for Hereford, Thomas joined Macclesfield Town on a two-year contract. In his first season Thomas was awarded the 'player's player of the season' award. He was offered a contract extension early in his second season, after initially turning it down, he then agreed the deal in the latter part of that season, only for the club to pull the deal at the end of the season. At the end of the contract he was released from the club.

In August 2009 he joined Conference National side Kettering Town.

On 15 June 2010, it was heavily speculated that Thomas would be joining Conference National team Tamworth, after leaving Kettering Town. The following day this was confirmed. Following a successful first season with The Lambs where Thomas picked up a handful of awards, he opted to stay with the club for a further season with the option to a further 12 months after that.

In May 2012, Icelandic club FH signed Thomas on a free transfer.
Having made a successful start to his Icelandic league career at Left-Back, Danny also made four appearances in the Europa League qualifiers before the club was knocked out of the competition by Swedish club AIK.

With 3 games left to play FH were crowned champions of the season. FH then went on to compete in the Champions League qualifiers in 2013.

In January 2013 Danny decided to retire from football to begin a career in the working world.

Career statistics

References

External links

1981 births
Living people
Sportspeople from Leamington Spa
English footballers
Association football wingers
Nottingham Forest F.C. players
Leicester City F.C. players
AFC Bournemouth players
Boston United F.C. players
Shrewsbury Town F.C. players
Hereford United F.C. players
Macclesfield Town F.C. players
Premier League players
English Football League players
Kettering Town F.C. players
Tamworth F.C. players
National League (English football) players
Fimleikafélag Hafnarfjarðar players